Naa Nuvve is a 2018 Indian Telugu-language romantic drama film written and directed by Jayendra Panchapakesan. It features Nandamuri Kalyan Ram and Tamannaah in the lead roles. P. C. Sreeram was the cinematographer and Sharreth composed the film's music. The film was released worldwide on 14 June 2018.

Plot 
True love is fulfilling. Meera is a happy go lucky radio jockey who ends up falling in love with a very confident Varun who is nothing like Meera in life. How far will Varun and Meera go to get their love that truly completes them.

Cast 
 Nandamuri Kalyan Ram as Varun
 Tamannaah as Meera
 Tanikella Bharani as Meera's father
 Posani Krishna Murali
 Vennela Kishore
 Surekha Vani
 Chevella Ravi
 Kalyani
 Praveen as Ravi
 Shekar Basha as FM Radio Jockey
L. B. Sriram

Soundtrack
The music was composed by Sharreth and released by Sony Music India.

Release 
The film was released worldwide on 14 June 2018. The film's Hindi dubbed version titled Diljala Aashiq will soon be released on YouTube by Goldmines Telefilms in 2020.

Critical reception
The Times of India rated the film 2/5 and called it "A dull and lifeless take on love and destiny!".
123 Telugu rated the film 2.75/5 and called it "a routine romantic drama which gets distracted by some wayward execution".
Greatandhra rated the film 2/5 and says "Looks like it was written on one-line idea, and director and his writers have woven silly scenes to this single point idea."

References

External links
 

2018 films
2010s Telugu-language films
Films scored by Sharreth
2018 romantic drama films
Indian romantic drama films